Tatiana Mikhailovna Turanskaya (born November 20, 1972 in Odessa, Ukrainian SSR) is a Transnistrian politician and was the Prime Minister of Transnistria until 13 October 2015. She replaced Pyotr Stepanov on 10 July 2013, after he had resigned to accept a new job. On August 7, 2013 she held a meeting with Deputy Chairman of the Economic Policy, Budget and Finance Committee of the Supreme Council Andrej Kotsubenko and member of the on Security, Defense and Peacekeeping Committee of the Supreme Council Yuri Horin at which she talked about governmental issues within Slobozia District.

Turanskaya decided to participate in the 2015 election and temporarily stepped down as prime minister. She was replaced by deputy PM Maya Parnas from 13 October 2015 until the day of elections (30 November). On 2 December 2015, she was dismissed by President Yevgeny Shevchuk and Maija Parnas replaced her again as Acting Prime Minister.

See also 
 Cabinet of Transnistria

References 

1972 births
Living people
People from Bilhorod-Dnistrovskyi
Transnistrian people of Ukrainian descent
Prime Ministers of Transnistria
Women government ministers of Transnistria
Women prime ministers
21st-century Moldovan women politicians
Odesa National Economics University alumni